Mohammed Ali Yaser (born 1964) is a Yemeni politician and MP.  He has been serving as governor of Al-Mahara since 23 February 2020.

Biography 
He was born in 1964 in al-Mahara, eastern Yemen. He has been a GPC MP since 1997. He held the post of Minister of State, Member of the Cabinet from 2001 to 2007. He was the governor of al-Mahara from 2014 to 2015 and then appointed again as its governor on 23 February 2020.

References 

1964 births
20th-century Yemeni politicians
21st-century Yemeni politicians
General People's Congress (Yemen) politicians
Members of the House of Representatives (Yemen)

Government ministers of Yemen
Governors of Al Mahrah Governorate
People from Al Mahrah Governorate
Living people
Yemeni ministers of state